KRCX-FM (99.9 FM) is a radio station broadcasting a Regional Mexican format. Licensed to Marysville, California, United States, it serves the Sacramento area.  The station is currently owned by Entravision Holdings, LLC.

Although KRCX does have a HD Radio channel, it has yet to sign on a HD2 or HD3 subcarrier.

On March 10, 1994, KRCX took over KRFD, after their purchase of the station.

Format history
1997–Present KRCX Regional Mexican
1994-1997 KSXX Regional Mexican
1992-1994 KRFD Progressive rock
1989-1992 KRFD Rock 40
1982-1989 KRFD Contemporary Hits
1978-1982 KRFD Adult Contemporary
1974-1978 KRFD Oldies/MOR
1970-1974 KRFD Progressive rock
1949-1970 KMYC-FM Simulcast KMYC 1410

References

External links
Profile at Rec Networks
KRCX callsign history
Talk about 99.9

RCX-FM
Marysville, California
Radio stations established in 1948
RCX-FM
Entravision Communications stations